Richard Aloysius Twine (May 11, 1896 – September 27, 1974) was a professional photographer in the Lincolnville section of St. Augustine, Florida (now the Lincolnville Historic District) in the 1920s. He was born in St. Augustine. After five years there he moved to Miami and worked at a restaurant before establishing a hotel.

In 1988 a collection of glass plate negatives was found in boxes in the attic of a house under demolition that had been Twine’s home. The collection was acquired by the St. Augustine Historical Society.

He photographed residents of Lincolnville commemorating Emancipation Day at the annual parade in 1920. He photographed an Excelsior School teacher and students at Florida Normal and Industrial Institute. His work includes a self-portrait.

The University of North Florida and Lincolnville Museum have been involved in documenting subjects in the photographs as they relate to Lincolnville’s history.

See also
Lincolnville Museum and Cultural Center
James Van Der Zee, photographer based in Harlem

References

External links

1896 births
1974 deaths
African-American photographers
Photographers from Florida
20th-century American photographers
People from St. Augustine, Florida
Businesspeople from Miami
American hoteliers
African-American company founders
20th-century American businesspeople
21st-century American businesspeople
20th-century African-American artists